Bhagwandas Moolchand Luthria (1944 – 12 May 2014) aka Sudhir was a Bollywood film actor.  He was best known for his role in the film Satte Pe Satta with Amitabh Bachchan. He acted in over 200 films in a career spanning from 1962 to 2009. He was one of Bollywood's best known villains from the 1970s through the 1990s.

Career
He acted in Prem Patra starring Sadhana and Shashi Kapoor (1962) as Subhash.He appeared in Apna Ghar Apni Kahani (Pyas) opposite Mumtaz in 1968, singing "Jigar me dard kaisa ishko ulfat to nhi kahate" and 'main ye sochkar uske dar se utha tha' from Haqeeqat (1964), 'mujhe raat din ye khayal hai' and 'mere dil pe andheri sa chhan laga' from Ek Phool Ek Bhool'.

He often played the second-in-command sidekick to villains Ajit, Prem Nath and Pran, a torturous police inspector, or a sleazy man. He was most known for his shrill voice, long moustache and sideburns. He starred in at least a dozen Amitabh Bachchan movies, such as Deewaar, Kaalia, Majboor, Sharaabi, Satte Pe Satta, Dostana, Shaan and Lal Baadshah. Other notable appearances included Feroz Khan's 1974 hit Khote Sikkay, its sequel Kachche Heere, Dharmatma, as well as Mera Gaon Mera Desh, and roles of a disabled thief in Dev Anand's Hare Rama Hare Krishna (1971), as Police Inspector (Special Appearances) in Subhash Ghai's Meri Jung (1985) and in the Shah Rukh Khan-starring Baadshah (1999). His last film appearances were in Jhoom Barabar Jhoom (2007) and Victoria House (2009).

He also played episodic roles in CID in 2003.

He died on 12 May 2014 at the age of 70. He had long been suffering from a lung infection.

Filmography

Films

Television

References

External links

2014 deaths
1944 births
Male actors in Hindi cinema
Place of birth missing
20th-century Indian male actors
Male actors from Mumbai
21st-century Indian male actors